Fisherton Station could refer to

 Antártida Argentina railway station in Rosario, Santa Fe, Argentina, which was known as Fisherton Station until 1948
 Salisbury railway station in Wiltshire, England, located on Fisherton Street.